(S)-β-macrocarpene synthase (TPS6, TPS11) is an enzyme with systematic name (S)-β-macrocarpene lyase (decyclizing). This enzyme catalyses the following chemical reaction

 (S)-β-bisabolene  (S)-β-macrocarpene

The synthesis of (S)-beta-macrocarpene from (2E,6E)-farnesyl diphosphate proceeds in two steps.

References

External links 
 

EC 5.5.1